Grenville is the second largest town in Grenada, after St. George's, and it is the capital of the largest parish, Saint Andrew Parish.  Grenville is located on Grenville Bay, about halfway up the east coast of the Caribbean island of Grenada and is heavily involved in the agriculture export industry. Grenville's Anglican Church and school stand at the north end of Victoria Street, the main thoroughfare along the bay.

The town has a population of about 2,400 residents, with many more in the surrounding region. It serves as an economic and transportation hub for that part of the island, and once was home to the largest nutmeg-processing plant in Grenada. The town's marketplace houses a variety of fruit, vegetable, craft and meat stalls. Although opened everyday, the most popular day for activity is Saturday, the island's traditional 'market day'. A newly opened bus terminal on Sendal street allows for public transport in the form of minibuses to and from the town.

On the outskirts of the town is Pearls Airport, Grenada's first airport. It is no longer used for aviation, but skeletons of abandoned Air Cuba planes are still present.

Eric Gairy, the first Prime Minister of Grenada, was born in Dunfermline near Grenville.

History
Founded and named for George Grenville (British Prime Minister, 1763–65). Grenville is also known as La Baye (its former French name).
 
It was the Parish Capital since 1796. Grenville has had a Court House on Sendal Street since c.1886. In 1981 Grenville Magistrate Court was built. The cricket ground Progress Park in located in the town and has hosted major cricket matches.

Education 
The town of Grenville hosts three secondary schools: the St. Joseph's Convent, the St. Andrews Anglican Secondary School and the Grenville Secondary School.

Grenville Secondary School

References 

Grenada - Explorations

Populated places in Grenada
Saint Andrew Parish, Grenada